Imidogen is an inorganic compound with the chemical formula NH. Like other simple radicals, it is highly reactive and consequently short-lived except as a dilute gas. Its behavior depends on its spin multiplicity.

Production and properties
Imidogen can be generated by electrical discharge in an atmosphere of ammonia.  

Imidogen has a large rotational splitting and a weak spin–spin interaction, therefore it will be less likely to undergo collision-induced Zeeman transitions. Ground-state imidogen can be magnetically trapped using buffer-gas loading from a molecular beam.

The ground state of imidogen is a triplet, with a singlet excited state only slightly higher in energy.

The first excited state (a1Δ) has a long lifetime as its relaxation to ground state (X3Σ−) is spin-forbidden. Imidogen undergoes collision-induced intersystem crossing.

Reactivity
Ignoring hydrogen atoms, imidogen is isoelectronic with carbene (CH2) and oxygen (O) atoms, and it exhibits comparable reactivity. The first excited state can be detected by laser-induced fluorescence (LIF).  LIF methods allow for detection of depletion, production, and chemical products of NH. It reacts with nitric oxide (NO):
NH + NO → N2 + OH
NH + NO → N2O + H

Nomenclature 
The trivial name nitrene is the preferred IUPAC name. The systematic names, λ1-azane and hydridonitrogen, valid IUPAC names, are constructed according to the substitutive and additive nomenclatures, respectively.

In appropriate contexts, imidogen can be viewed as ammonia with two hydrogen atoms removed, and as such, azylidene may be used as a context-specific systematic name, according to substitutive nomenclature. By default, this name pays no regard to the radicality of the imidogen molecule. Although, in even more specific context, it can also name the non-radical state, whereas the diradical state is named azanediyl.

Astrochemistry
Interstellar NH was identified in the diffuse clouds toward ζ Persei and HD 27778 from high-resolution high-signal-to-noise spectra of the NH A3Π→X3Σ (0,0) absorption band near 3358 Å. A temperature of about  favored an efficient production of CN from NH within the diffuse cloud.

Reactions relevant to astrochemistry
{| class="wikitable" border="1"
|+ Chemical reactions
|-
! Reaction
! Rate constant
! Rate/[H2]2
|-
| N + H− → NH + e−
| 
| 
|-
| NH2 + O → NH + OH
| 
| 
|-
|  + e− → NH + H
| 
| 
|-
|  + e− → NH + H + H
| 
| 
|-
| NH + N → N2 + H
| 
| 
|-
| NH + O → OH + N
| 
| 
|-
| NH + C+ → CN+ + H
| 
| 
|-
| NH + H3+ →  + H2
| 
| 
|-
| NH + H+ → NH+ + H
| 
| 
|}

Within diffuse clouds H− + N → NH + e− is a major formation mechanism. Depending on the radiation field in the diffuse cloud, NH2 can also contribute.

NH is destroyed in diffuse clouds by photodissociation and photoionization. In dense clouds NH is destroyed by reactions with atomic oxygen and nitrogen. O+ and N+ form OH and NH in diffuse clouds. NH is involved in creating N2, OH, H, CN+, CH, N, NH+ for the interstellar medium.

NH has been reported in the diffuse interstellar medium but not in dense molecular clouds. The purpose of detecting NH is often to get a better estimate of the rotational constants and vibrational levels of NH. It is also needed in order to confirm theoretical data which predicts N and NH abundances in stars which produce N and NH and other stars with leftover trace amounts of N and NH. Using current values for rotational constants and vibrations of NH as well as those of OH and CH permit studying the carbon, nitrogen and oxygen abundances without resorting to a full spectrum synthesis with a 3D model atmosphere.

See also
 Diimide (dimer)
 List of interstellar and circumstellar molecules

References

External links

Interstellar media
Nitrogen hydrides

Free radicals
Diatomic molecules